Hurdalssjøen is a lake in the municipalities of Hurdal, Eidsvoll and Nannestad in Viken county, Norway.

See also
List of lakes in Norway

Eidsvoll
Hurdal
Nannestad
Lakes of Viken (county)